Peter John Hawker, OBE (born 1937) was Archdeacon of Switzerland from 2004 to 2006.

Hawker was educated at Exeter University and Wycliffe Hall Oxford; and ordained in 1971. He was at Berne from 1970 to 1976; Neuchâtel from 1976 to 1979; and Brussels from 1979 to 1986.

Notes

1937 births
Alumni of the University of Exeter
Alumni of Wycliffe Hall, Oxford
Archdeacons of Switzerland
Living people
20th-century English Anglican priests
21st-century Anglican priests
Officers of the Order of the British Empire